Coleophora caespititiella is a moth of the family Coleophoridae. This species is found throughout the United Kingdom and most of Europe. It is also known from North America. The Coleophoridae group are often collectively known as the case moths or case-bearers.

Description
The larvae feed on rushes (Juncus species), producing spun silken pupal cases within which they overwinter on the seed heads. The adults are small and brown with pointed wings. Head light greyish-ochreous. Antennae white, ringed with fuscous anteriorly except towards apex. Forewings greyish-ochreous, sometimes whitish-sprinkled, rather shining; costa distinctly white from base to 2/3 shading into cilia posteriorly; rarely somewhat darker streaks between veins towards costa. Hindwings grey.

Gallery

See also
 Juncus effusus

References

Sources
 Chinery, Michael (1986). Collins Guide to the Insects of Britain and Western Europe. London : W. Collins. .
 Baldizzone, van der Wolf & Landry (2006) World Catalogue of Insects.

External links
 UKmoths
 Lepiforum.de

caespititiella
Moths described in 1839
Moths of Europe
Moths of North America
Taxa named by Philipp Christoph Zeller